Joseph Francis Breslin (May 21, 1950 – June 28, 1982) was an American serial killer. A former mental patient with a record for murder in Pennsylvania and an attempted murder, he was sought after for a 1982 double murder in his hometown of San Luis Obispo, California, but before he could be caught, he was fatally wounded in a gunfight with sheriffs and several campers in Jackpot, Nevada. He was driven to a hospital in Twin Falls, Idaho, where he subsequently succumbed to his injuries.

Background
A native of Philadelphia born on May 21, 1950, Breslin reportedly had a history of mental illness, for which he spent time in two separate mental institutions in Pennsylvania during the 1960s. While residing there, he killed a fellow patient in 1968 and attacked a nurse, but due to confidentiality, these incidents were covered up and details were never released.

At some point in 1975, he was transferred to the California Men's Colony, where he became acquainted with Douglas Cain, his cellmate. Two years later, under unclear circumstances, he shot a man in the head with a shotgun, but the victim survived. After accepting a plea deal with the prosecutors, his charges were reduced to assault with a deadly weapon, and he was given a 3-year prison term. After serving out his sentence, Breslin returned to San Luis Obispo.

Double murder, escape and death
On the night between June 23 and 24, 1982, Breslin went to the apartment of 37-year-old Linda Sue Cain, the wife of the mental patient he had befriended in the California Men's Colony years prior. Once he was allowed inside, for unclear reasons, he proceeded to stab to death Cain and then strangle her 8-year-old daughter, Desiree. He then moved their bodies to the bathroom, leaving behind a penned letter full of incoherent rambling, profanities and his apparent desire to end his life. Breslin then stole Cain's car and headed towards Nevada.

While passing through the state, Breslin crashed the car in a ditch near Jackpot. Unable to continue forward, he hitched a ride to the nearby Little Salmon Creek camping area, where he was provided aid by campers and told to stay put until police arrived. A sheriff's deputy, 49-year-old Denny Lawrence, was notified of the incident and drove to the area, and after locating the car, he drove to the rest area to check on the driver. After confirming that he had no injuries, Lawrence went to file an accident form and to check the man's driver's license on the hood of his car, when Breslin suddenly got up, walked up behind him and shot him in the back of the head with his .22 caliber pistol, which he had concealed with a blanket. While the shot was not fatal, Lawrence was left in critical condition, while Breslin took his revovler and started firing both guns at the campers, apparently intent on killing them all. After fleeing into their camper vans, two unnamed brothers got their own firearms and returned fire upon Breslin, hitting him four times in the chest and once in the leg. Once he fell to the ground, the bystanders called an ambulance, which transported both Breslin and Lawrence to separate hospitals in nearby Idaho.

Breslin was transported to the Magic Valley Memorial Hospital in Twin Falls, but died from his injuries on June 28, 1982. In contrast, Lawrence, who had been transported to the St. Alphonsus Hospital in Boise, was left comatose for several days, but ultimately survived his injuries, albeit left permanently disabled until his death in 2012. While examining Breslin's body, a letter was found, in which Breslin proclaimed that it was his "New Year's resolution" to be dead before 1983, and that his body should be thrown into a river. After checking the registration on Breslin's car, Nevada authorities discovered that it was registered to Linda Cain, who had been killed along with her daughter a week before the shootings. Surmising that the incidents were linked, citing the similarly written letters and the fact that Breslin knew his victims, the cases were officially closed. However, no motive for Breslin's crimes was ever established, and the exact reason for his suicidal tendencies remains unclear.

See also
 List of serial killers in the United States

External links
 Birth Index

References

1950 births
1982 deaths
20th-century American criminals
American male criminals
American murderers of children
American people convicted of attempted murder
American serial killers
Deaths by firearm in Nevada
Criminals from Philadelphia
Male serial killers